Georgetown is a rural town and locality in the Shire of Etheridge, Queensland, Australia.

History 
Georgetown area may have been part of North America 1.7 billion years ago based on the characteristics of rocks found in Georgetown matching those of northern Canada rather than the rest of Australia. Researchers at Curtin University have postulated that 100 million years later, this landmass collided with what is now northern Australia, at the Mount Isa region, forming the Nuna supercontinent.

Georgetown was on the northern border of  Ewamin lands.

The Etheridge River was the site of a gold rush in the 1870s; the town of Georgetown was established on the site of the diggings. Originally known by the name Etheridge, the town's name was changed in 1871 to honour an early gold commissioner, Howard St George. Georgetown Post Office opened on 15 January 1872.

Georgetown State School opened on 14 September 1874.

By 1900, grazing had replaced gold mining as the region's primary source of income.

The Georgetown Public Library opened in 2003.

Geography 
Georgetown is on the Etheridge River in Far North Queensland, Australia. The Gulf Developmental Road passes through the town, linking Cairns -  to the east - and Normanton -  to the west. Georgetown is the administrative headquarters of the Shire of Etheridge, a local government area encompassing the nearby settlements of Mount Surprise, Forsayth and Einasleigh.

Climate
Georgetown has a borderline tropical savanna climate (Köppen Aw) bordering on a hot semi-arid climate (BSh). The wet season from mid-November to March is hot and humid with like all of tropical Queensland highly erratic rainfall. During the wet season, rainfall is highly concentrated into a few days from monsoonal depressions or remnant cyclones. Wet season weather can vary from daily thunderstorm rains in active monsoon months like January and February of 1974 when rain fell on fifty-five consecutive days and  fell between December and March, to long sweltering and dry spells as in 1925/1926, when only  fell during those four months. The dry season from April to mid-November is very warm, becoming sweltering in the “build-up” to the wet season during October and November and almost completely dry.

Heritage listings 
Georgetown has a number of heritage-listed sites, including:
 Gulf Developmental Road: Aspasia Mine and Battery
 South Street: Antbed House

Education 
Georgetown State School is a government primary (Early Childhood-6) school for boys and girls at High Street. In 2014, Georgetown State School had an enrolment of 57 students with 3 teachers. In 2018, the school had an enrolment of 42 students with 4 teachers (3 full-time equivalent) and 7 non-teaching staff (4 full-time equivalent).

There are no secondary schools in Georgetown, nor nearby. The options are distance education and boarding school.

Facilities

Georgetown has a racecourse, swimming pool and a tourist information centre and camping/caravan park.

The Etheridge Shire Council operates a public library at Low Street, Georgetown.

The Georgetown branch of the Queensland Country Women's Association has its rooms on the Gulf Developmental Road.

The Terrestrial Information Centre contains the Ted Elliot Mineral Collection, comprising over 4500 local and international mineral specimens.

St Patrick's Catholic Church is at 26 High Street. It is within the Gulf Savannah Parish of the Roman Catholic Diocese of Cairns.

In popular culture 
Georgetown is one of the real locations mentioned several times in the novel A Town Like Alice by Nevil Shute.

References

External links 

 University of Queensland: Queensland Places: Georgetown
 Etheridge Shire Council
 Town information
 Town map, 1983
 1.7-Billion-Year-Old Chunk of North America Found Sticking to Australia

Towns in Queensland
Populated places in Far North Queensland
Shire of Etheridge
Localities in Queensland